Leonor Poeiras is a Portuguese television presenter.

References

Living people
Portuguese television presenters
Year of birth missing (living people)